Bamberger Marionettentheater is a puppet theatre in Bamberg, Bavaria, Germany.

Theatres in Bavaria